Marina State Beach is a protected beach on Monterey Bay, located in the city of Marina in Monterey County, California.

Recreation
The park is popular with hang-gliders, paragliders, and kite flyers. It is also a popular spot from which to watch the sun set.  Surfers frequent Marina State Beach due to its reliable waves.  The  park was established in 1977.

Natural history
The dunes are some of the highest on the Central California coast, and provide homes to unique wildlife. A short interpretive trail (0.6 miles) provides visitors with information about the habitat and inhabitants of the dunes.

See also
 List of beaches in California
 List of California state parks

References

External links

 Parks.ca.gov: Marina State Beach website

California State Beaches
Beaches of Monterey County, California
Parks in Monterey County, California
Monterey Bay
Gliding in the United States
Hang gliding sites
Protected areas established in 1977
1977 establishments in California
Beaches of Northern California